Morningside is an incorporated town in Prince George's County, Maryland, United States. Per the 2020 census, the population was 1,240. The town developed with the establishment of nearby Andrews Air Force Base and the federal Census Bureau. The government of the town is led by a mayor and town council. Morningside Elementary School and Benjamin Foulois Junior High School/Elementary/Creative and Performing Arts Academy (current) as well as Michael J Polley Neighborhood Park are located within the town limits. Morningside has one of the largest VFW posts (chapters) in the entire country.  Morningside is also the city of license of one of Washington's most prominent radio stations, from the 1960s to the present, WJFK and WPGC-FM. Additionally, Morningside is home to one of the busiest volunteer fire departments in Prince George's County, Morningside VFD Station 827. In 2015, station 827 ran over 8,000 calls for service with 150 working fires in Morningside and the adjacent communities, and has garnered national recognition for their service to the community.

Geography
Morningside is located at  (38.825563, -76.890219).

Adjacent areas
 Joint Base Andrews (southeast)
 Forestville (northwest)
 Camp Springs (southwest)
 District Heights (north)

Demographics

2020 census

Note: the US Census treats Hispanic/Latino as an ethnic category. This table excludes Latinos from the racial categories and assigns them to a separate category. Hispanics/Latinos can be of any race.

2010 census
As of the census of 2010, there were 2,015 people, 851 households, and 465 families living in the town. The racial makeup of the town was 20.6% White, 67.3% African American, 0.3% Native American, 3.9% Asian, 0.1% Pacific Islander, 4.9% from other races, and 2.8% from two or more races. Hispanic or Latino of any race were 8.6% of the population.

There were 851 households, of which 29.4% had children under the age of 18 living with them, 30.3% were married couples living together, 18.6% had a female householder with no husband present, 5.8% had a male householder with no wife present, and 45.4% were non-families. 36.4% of all households were made up of individuals, and 4.7% had someone living alone who was 65 years of age or older. The average household size was 2.37 and the average family size was 3.15.

The median age in the town was 34.6 years. 22.2% of residents were under the age of 18; 8.8% were between the ages of 18 and 24; 36.8% were from 25 to 44; 24.6% were from 45 to 64; and 7.7% were 65 years of age or older. The gender makeup of the town was 46.2% male and 53.8% female.

2000 census
As of the census of 2000, there were 1,295 people, 459 households, and 335 families living in the town. The racial makeup of the town was 42.55% White, 51.27% African American, 0.31% Native American, 2.08% Asian, 0.62% from other races, and 3.17% from two or more races. Hispanic or Latino of any race were 3.09% of the population.

There were 459 households, out of which 27.5% had children under the age of 18 living with them, 48.8% were married couples living together, 18.3% had a female householder with no husband present, and 26.8% were non-families. 20.7% of all households were made up of individuals, and 9.8% had someone living alone who was 65 years of age or older. The average household size was 2.82 and the average family size was 3.27.

In the town, the population was spread out, with 24.9% under the age of 18, 7.3% from 18 to 24, 28.0% from 25 to 44, 27.6% from 45 to 64, and 12.3% who were 65 years of age or older. The median age was 39 years. For every 100 females, there were 93.0 males. For every 100 females age 18 and over, there were 93.1 males.

The median income for a household in the town was $56,429, and the median income for a family was $61,364. Males had a median income of $38,958 versus $35,694 for females. The per capita income for the town was $22,333. About 3.3% of families and 6.4% of the population were below the poverty line, including 9.6% of those under age 18 and 2.7% of those age 65 or over.

Government
Prince George's County Police Department District 4 Station in Glassmanor CDP, with an Oxon Hill postal address, serves the community.

The town maintains a police department and public works department.

Education
Residents are zoned to Prince George's County Public Schools (PGCPS):
 William Beanes Elementary School
 Drew-Freeman Middle School
 Dr. Henry A. Wise, Jr. High School

It was formerly served by PGCPS Morningside Elementary, which opened in 1956 was in the town limits. The school, which had a capacity of 300 students, closed in 2009. At the end of its life it was one of the few PGCPS schools in which significant numbers of students traveled to school on foot. A report made by a non-PGCPS authority generated around 2009 stated that the condition of Morningside Elementary's building was one of the poorest of any school in Prince George's County. By 2011 Imagine Schools was scheduled to open a campus in the former Morningside Elementary, now known as Imagine Foundations at Morningside Public Charter School, which serves grades PK-8.

Transportation

The largest highway serving Morningside is the Capital Beltway (Interstate 495) and Interstate 95). I-95 is the major highway along the East Coast of the United States, serving many major cities, while I-495 encircles Washington, D.C.

Notable people
 Gerald Glaubitz, former Mayor
 Karen Rooker, Former Mayor
 Kenneth C Wade, Former Mayor
 Bennard J. Cann, Mayor

References

External links

 
 Municipal government in Maryland
 Town of Morningside at the Maryland State Archives
 History of the Town of Morningside
 Who was Benjamin D. Foulois
 Morningside Town Charter
 

Towns in Prince George's County, Maryland
Washington metropolitan area